Voergaard Castle is a moated Renaissance manor house located 10 km north of Dronninglund on the North Jutland peninsula in north-western Denmark. It is open to the public and houses a significant art collection.

History

Early history
Voergaard's recorded history goes back to 1481. At the outbreak of the Count's Feud it was owned by Stygge Krumpen, Bishop of Børglum, taken by Skipper Clement's army of peasants and then, after the Reformation, confiscated by the Crown in 1536.

Ingeborg Skeel's castle
In 1578, King Frederick II ceded the property to Karen Krabbe in exchange for Nygaard, an estate located between Vejle and Kolding. Krabbe's daughter, Ingeborg Skeel, took over the property from her mother and carried out an expansion which was completed in 1588.

Over the following two centuries, Voergaard changed hands many times. Much of the land was sold.

Scavenius era

In 1872 it was purchased by Peder Brønnum Scavenius, a politician and land owner, who re-acquired much of the land which had previously been sold. At the time of his death in 1914, the estate covered 1,944.4 ha of land, making it one of the largest in Denmark at the time. The next owner was his son, Erik Scavenius, Danish Prime Minister during World War II, who owned Voergaard from 1914 to 1945.

An art venue
In 1955 Voergaard was acquired by Ejnar Oberbech-Clausen, a Dane who had lived in France since 1906 where he had become a count through his marriage with Marie Henriette Chenu-Lafitte, the widow of his former employer, and an Imperial Count in the Holy Roman Empire. Chenu-Lafitte was the daughter of Jules-Émile Péan, one of the great French surgeons of the 19th century, and owned an extensive art collection which originated both from her father and deceased husband.

The couple owned several châteaus in the area around Bordeaux but after his wife's death, in an air raid in 1941, Oberbech-Clausen moved to Paris and later decided to return to his native Denmark. He acquired Voergaard and, with approval from the French state, brought 12 train cars of art with him back to Denmark. He undertook a comprehensive and costly restoration of the castle which went on for several years. After his death in 1963, the castle and collections were passed to a foundation and opened to the public.

Architecture
Voergaard is a two-winged, L-shaped castle built in red brick in the Renaissance style. The east wing is flanked by two octagonal corner towers and penetrated by a gateway. Its sandstone portal was a gift from King Frederick II and originally created for Frederiksborg Castle.

Art collection
The art collection contains works attributed to Francisco Goya, Peter Paul Rubens, Raphael, El Greco, Watteau and Frans Hals.

The furniture includes pieces which have belonged to Louis XIV and Louis XVI.

Park

The large park was originally laid out in 1768. In 1955 it was re-designed in the French style. Buildings in the grounds include a half-timbered building which in the 18th and 19th century was used by Voer Birk,a manor court where people who had committed local misdemeanors and petty crimes would be dealt with

References

External links

 
 "The Medieval Festival at Voergaard Castle"

Houses completed in 1588
Castles in Denmark
Historic house museums in Denmark
Renaissance architecture in Denmark
Listed buildings and structures in Brønderslev Municipality
Art museums and galleries in Denmark
Museums in the North Jutland Region